The Lola T110 was a Group 6 and Group 7 sports prototype race car, designed, developed, and built by British manufacturer Lola, specifically to compete in hill climb racing briefly alongside the T120, in 1967. It was powered by a  BMW Apfelbeck straight-four engine.

The name was also used for an unraced stillborn conceptual Formula One race car, which was planned to have been constructed in 1967 by Eric Broadley and John Surtees, but never raced.

References

Sports prototypes
T110
Formula One cars that never raced